The Radio One Sessions is a 2002 album by the Canadian alt-country band Cowboy Junkies. The compilation album was released only in Canada and the United Kingdom, and compiles tracks that the band recorded for BBC Radio One in the UK. The Radio One Sessions was released on Strange Fruit Records in the UK, and Latent Recordings in Canada.

BBC sessions 
The Cowboy Junkies promoted their music when touring by performing radio sessions, like most other bands. They have performed sessions by squeezing three or four bodies in DJ booths that are designed for one person, and in state of the art recording studios where there is room for several band members. Radio One is BBC's premier station for contemporary pop music, and has been hosting sessions with almost every touring band for over 40 years, setting the standard for radio sessions, hosting the like of the Beatles, Led Zeppelin, Jimi Hendrix, Cream, Captain Beefheart, and others. The Cowboy Junkies were invited to perform at Radio One on various tours when they were in the UK. Each visit to the recording studio had a different line-up of players. For their first session in 1989, only Michael and Margo Timmins from the Junkies, plus two members of their touring band, Jeff Bird and Jano Czerwinec performed, for the 1992 session, Michael, Margo, and Jeff Bird performed, and for the 1996 session, only the core members of the Cowboy Junkies were present.

Track listing 

Tracks 1 to 5 were recorded on July 3, 1989 for Saturday Sequence. Tracks 6 to 8 were recorded on February 27, 1992 for Nicky Horne. Tracks 9 to 12 were recorded on February 27, 1996 for Mark Radcliffe.

Personnel 
Cowboy Junkies
Margo Timmins – vocals
Michael Timmins – guitar, backing vocals
Alan Anton – bass (tracks 9 - 12)
Peter Timmins – drums (tracks 9 - 12)

Additional musicians
Jeff Bird – harmonica (tracks 1 - 8), mandolin, tambourine (tracks 1 - 5)
Jaro Czerwinec – accordion (tracks 1 - 5)

Production
Peter Watts – producer (tracks 1 - 5)
Pat Coupe - producer (tracks 9 - 12)
Ted de Bono – engineer (tracks 1 - 5)
Chris Lee - engineer (tracks 9 - 12)

References

External links 

Cowboy Junkies albums
BBC Radio recordings
2002 live albums
2002 compilation albums
Latent Recordings albums